The sixth season of the Case Closed anime was directed by Yasuichiro Yamamoto and produced by TMS Entertainment and Yomiuri Telecasting Corporation. The series is based on Gosho Aoyama's Case Closed manga series. In Japan, the series is titled  but was changed due to legal issues with the title Detective Conan. The episodes' plot follows the adventures of Conan Edogawa.

The episodes use four pieces of theme music: two opening themes and two closing themes. The first opening theme is "Truth ~Great Detective of Love~" by Two-Mix until episode 142. The first ending theme is "Still for your love" by Rumania Montevideo until episode 152. It is followed by "Free Magic" by Wag for the rest of the season.

The season initially ran from February 15, 1999, through September 27, 1999 on Nippon Television Network System in Japan. Episodes 135 to 162 were later collected into seven DVD compilations by Shogakukan. They were released between October 25, 2000, and December 15, 2000, in Japan.


Episode list

Notes

 The episode was aired as a single hour long episode in Japan

References
General

Specific

1999 Japanese television seasons
Season 6